Events in the year 1891 in Mexico.

Incumbents
President: Porfirio Diaz

Governors
 Aguascalientes: Alejandro Vázquez del Mercado
 Campeche: Joaquín Kerlegand/Leocadio Preve
 Chiapas: Manuel Carrascosa/Emilio Rabasa
 Chihuahua: Lauro Carrillo
 Coahuila: José María Garza Galán
 Colima: Gildardo Gómez Campero
 Durango:  
 Guanajuato: 
 Guerrero: 
 Hidalgo: 
 Jalisco: 
 State of Mexico:  
 Michoacán: 
 Morelos: Jesús H. Preciado
 Nuevo León: Bernardo Reyes
 Oaxaca: 
 Puebla: 
 Querétaro: Francisco González de Cosío
 San Luis Potosí: Carlos Díez Gutiérrez
 Sinaloa: 
 Sonora: 
 Tabasco: 
 Tamaulipas:
 Tlaxcala: 	 
 Veracruz: Juan de la Luz Enríquez Lara
 Yucatán: Colonel Daniel Traconis
 Zacatecas:

Events
June 23 – establishment of the Roman Catholic Archdiocese of Chihuahua, Roman Catholic Diocese of Cuernavaca, Roman Catholic Diocese of Saltillo, Roman Catholic Diocese of Tehuantepec and Roman Catholic Diocese of Tepic
September 15 – Garza Revolution: 60-80 followers of Catarino Garza crossed the Rio Grande from Texas into Mexico. Most are Mexican-Americans recruited locally.
September 16 – a telegram is sent from Fort Ringgold to the United States Army's Department of Texas informing of the crossing
December 26 – The Mexican Army is attacked by Garza's followers in a raid from San Ygnacio, Texas

Births

Deaths
February 4 – Pelagio Antonio de Labastida y Dávalos, Roman Catholic prelate and politician (b. 1816)
 December 17 – José María Iglesias, Mexican lawyer and journalist, interim president from 1876 to 1877 (b. 1823)

See also
Garza Revolution

References

 
Years of the 19th century in Mexico